Walter Feichter (born 1 April 1974) is an Italian snowboarder. He competed in the men's parallel giant slalom event at the 2002 Winter Olympics.

References

1974 births
Living people
Italian male snowboarders
Olympic snowboarders of Italy
Snowboarders at the 2002 Winter Olympics
Sportspeople from Bruneck
21st-century Italian people